The 2018 Collegiate Basketball Awards was an  awarding ceremony recognizing the champion teams, players and coaches from the University Athletic Association of the Philippines Season 80 and the National Collegiate Athletic Association Season 93 men's basketball tournaments and UAAP women's basketball tournaments. The CBA is organized by the UAAP Press Corps and the NCAA Press Corps, a group of sportswriters and reporters from print and online media who are covering the two top-tier collegiate leagues in the Philippines. UAAP Press Corps is headed by Reuben Terrado of Spin.ph and NCAA Press Corps is headed by Cedelf P. Tupas of Philippine Daily Inquirer.

The awarding ceremony was held at The Bayleaf Hotel, Intramuros, Manila on June 21, 2018.

Robert Bolick from the San Beda Red Lions was crowned as the Collegiate Player of the Year. Tab Baldwin and Boyet Fernandez, for their part  received the Coaches of the Year honors. For the first time in the history of CBA, Afril Bernardino from the NU Lady Bulldogs was recognized as the first female awardee as she scored the Pivotal Player of the Year award.

Awardees

See also
2017 in Philippine sports

References

2018 in Philippine sport
2018 sports awards